The 1948 Texas Mines Miners football team was an American football team that represented Texas School of Mines (now known as University of Texas at El Paso) as a member of the Border Conference during the 1948 college football season. In its third season under head coach Jack Curtice, the team compiled an 8–2–1 record (4–1–1 against Border Conference opponents), finished second in the conference, defeated West Virginia in the 1949 Sun Bowl, and outscored all opponents by a total of 361 to 182.

Schedule

References

Texas Mines
UTEP Miners football seasons
Texas Mines Miners football